Campbell Bay is a village in the Nicobar district of Andaman and Nicobar Islands, India. It is located in the Great Nicobar tehsil. The island's Indira Point is famous for being the southernmost point of India.

Demographics 

According to the 2011 census of India, Campbell Bay has 1608 households. The effective literacy rate (i.e. the literacy rate of population excluding children aged 6 and below) is 86.28%.

National park
Campbell Bay National Park is a part of Great Nicobar Biosphere Reserve. This national park is spread over 426 km2 in the northern part of Great Nicobar. The park reserve's flora includes tropical evergreen forest, tree fern, and orchids and fauna includes Crab-eating macaque, giant robber crab, megapode, and Nicobar pigeon. This comes along the basin side of Glatiya river. The capital of these islands is Port Blair, these Islands were named Swaraj Shahid Island by Netaji Subash Chandra bose.

INS Baaz 
INS Baaz was inaugurated on 31 July 2012 by Admiral Nirmal Verma of Indian Navy. INS Baaz is a full-fledged "forward operating base" of the Indian Naval Air Arm at the very southernmost tip of the Andaman Nicobar Islands. The Naval Air Station (NAS) Campbell Bay overlooking the six degree Channel, one of the most crucial shipping lanes of the world, will soon become India's eye over the Malacca strait and the Bay of Bengal.

References 

Villages in Great Nicobar tehsil
Landforms of the Andaman and Nicobar Islands
Bays of India
Bays of the Indian Ocean